Areta Konomi (born January 31, 1989, in Tirana, Albania) is a Greek retired volleyball player, who is a member of the Greece women's national volleyball team. She became a well-known competitor with Hellenic powerhouse Olympiacos Piraeus. As a member of the Piraeus club, she won the Golden Metal of CEV Women's Challenge Cup in the 2018 edition.

Sporting achievements

Clubs

International competitions
 2016/2017 : CEV Women's Challenge Cup, with Olympiacos S.F. Piraeus
 2017/2018 : CEV Women's Challenge Cup, with Olympiacos S.F. Piraeus

National championships
 2012/2013  Hellenic Championship, with Olympiacos Piraeus
 2013/2014  Hellenic Championship, with Olympiacos Piraeus
 2014/2015  Hellenic Championship, with Olympiacos Piraeus
 2015/2016  Hellenic Championship, with Olympiacos Piraeus
 2016/2017  Hellenic Championship, with Olympiacos Piraeus
 2017/2018  Hellenic Championship, with Olympiacos Piraeus
 2018/2019  Hellenic Championship, with Olympiacos Piraeus

National cups
 2012/2013  Hellenic Cup, with Olympiacos Piraeus
 2013/2014  Hellenic Cup, with Olympiacos Piraeus
 2014/2015  Hellenic Cup, with Olympiacos Piraeus
 2015/2016  Hellenic Cup, with Olympiacos Piraeus
 2016/2017  Hellenic Cup, with Olympiacos Piraeus
 2017/2018  Hellenic Cup, with Olympiacos Piraeus
 2018/2019  Hellenic Cup, with Olympiacos Piraeus

Individuals
 2013/2014 Hellenic Championship MVP
 2014/2015 Women's CEV Cup Best receiver

References

External links
 profile at greekvolley.eu 
 profile at CEV web site at cev.eu
 Olympiacos Women's Volleyball team roster at CEV web site
 Hellenic Women National Team - caps www.volleyball.gr
 Profile at /women.volleybox.net women.volleybox.net

1989 births
Living people
Olympiacos Women's Volleyball players
Greek women's volleyball players
Naturalized citizens of Greece
Greek people of Albanian descent
Sportspeople from Tirana